Salmara South Assembly constituency is one of the 126 assembly constituencies of  Assam a north east state of India.  Salmara is also part of Dhubri Lok Sabha constituency.

Members of Legislative Assembly
 1978: Dewan Joynal Abedin, Independent
 1983: Mohammad Bazlul Basit, Indian National Congress
 1985: Dewan Joynal Abedin, Independent
 1991: Dewan Joynal Abedin, Independent
 1996: Wazed Ali Choudhury, Indian National Congress
 2001: Wazed Ali Choudhury, Indian National Congress
 2006: Badruddin Ajmal, Assam United Democratic Front
 2009 (by elections): Wazed Ali Choudhury, Indian National Congress
 2011: Abdur Rehman Ajmal, All India United Democratic Front
 2016: Wazed Ali Choudhury, Indian National Congress
 2021:  Wazed Ali Choudhury , Indian National Congress

Election results

2016 results

2011 results

See also
 South Salmara
 Dhubri district
 South Salmara-Mankachar District
 List of constituencies of Assam Legislative Assembly

References

External links 
 

Assembly constituencies of Assam
South Salmara-Mankachar district